The Spoilers is a 1914 American silent Western film directed by Colin Campbell. The film is set in Nome, Alaska during the 1898 Gold Rush, with William Farnum as Roy Glennister, Kathlyn Williams as Cherry Malotte, and Tom Santschi as Alex McNamara. The film culminates in a spectacular saloon fistfight between Glennister and McNamara. In 1916, an expanded version was released, running 110 minutes.

The film was adapted to screen by Lanier Bartlett from the Rex Beach novel of the same name. The film was remade in 1923 (with Noah Beery as McNamara), 1930 (with Gary Cooper as Glennister and Betty Compson as Malotte), 1942 (with John Wayne as Glennister, Randolph Scott as McNamara, and Marlene Dietrich as Malotte), and 1955 (with Jeff Chandler as Glennister, Rory Calhoun as McNamara, and Anne Baxter as Malotte). All of the films feature a lengthy, intense fight sequence.

Plot summary

Cast
 William Farnum as Roy Glenister
 Kathlyn Williams as Cherry Malotte
 Thomas Santschi as Alex McNamara
 Bessie Eyton as Helen Chester
 Frank Clark as Dextry (billed; Frank M. Clark)
 Jack McDonald as Slap Jack (billed; Jack F. McDonald)
 Wheeler Oakman as Drury, The Broncho Kid
 Norval MacGregor as Judge Stillman
 William Ryno as Struve
 Marshall Farnum as Lawyer Wheatin
 Jules White 
 Cleo Ridgely

Preservation status
The film exists in the Raymond Rohauer (Cohen Media Group) collection in an incomplete print.

References

External links

 
 
 
 
 The Spoilers (1914) at SilentEra
 The Spoilers (1914) at YouTube
 lobby poster

1914 films
1914 Western (genre) films
1914 drama films
Articles containing video clips
American black-and-white films
Films based on American novels
Films based on Western (genre) novels
Films based on The Spoilers (Beach novel)
Films directed by Colin Campbell
Selig Polyscope Company films
Silent American Western (genre) films
Films set in Alaska
1910s American films
1910s English-language films